Andante is a 2017 South Korean television series starring Kim Jong-in, Baek Chul-min, Lee Ye-hyun, and Kim Jin-kyung. It aired on KBS1 from September 24, 2017, to January 7, 2018, every Sunday at 10:10 (KST).

Synopsis
A high school student named Lee Shi-kyung (Kai) moves to the countryside with his family and discovers a real-life ecosystem.

Cast

Main 
 Kim Jong-in as Lee Shi-kyung
An antisocial high school student who is a VVIP at his nearest PC room.
 Baek Chul-min as Park Ga-ram
 An elite student with a warm temperament and dreams of becoming a doctor.
 Lee Ye-hyun as Lee Shi-young
Shi-Kyung's younger sister has a prickly personality and is a cosplay otaku.
 Kim Jin-kyung as Kim Bom
 A mysterious student, who has a cool-girl aura and is so shy to approach her fellow students.

Supporting

Shi-kyung and Shi-young's family 
 Jeon Mi-seon as Oh Jung-won, Shi-kyung's mother
  as Kim Duk-boon, Shi-kyung's grandmother
 Park Ji-yeon as Oh Jung-soo, Shi-kyung's aunt

People at the Hospital 
  as Park Young-geun
 Kim Joo-ryoung as Young-sook
 Lee Chang-joo as Yum Chang-hoon
  as patient Kim Jae-woong

School Staff 
  as Do Kyung-ja
  as Choi Jong-min
 Jay Kim as Kang Hyun-woo

Students 
  as Suk Joo-yeon
The class president who has a forceful, direct personality and strong leadership skills but becomes a tongue-tied and bashful in front of the boy she likes.
  as Eom Yong-gi
A troubled school rebel who is threatened by Shi-kyung's arrival and views him as a rival. 
 Ahn Seung-gyun as Min Ki-hoon
A cheerful student who has an insatiable curiosity about people and the talkative school gossip.
  as Kim Ji-hye
A sweet ordinary girl without any special dreams until she meets Shi-young and learns how to ponder her future goals.
 Kim Jung-ho as Kim Min-seok

Others 
 Shin Cheol-jin as Han-young
 Lee Jin-kwon
 Jang Ki-hyun
 Kim Hyung-joo
 Lee Sang-yi as Sung Joon
 Son Jin-hwan
 Lee Chae-min as Do-young
 Yoo Hae-byul
 Jo Han-sol
 Son Soo-min
 
 Lee Jin-kwon
  as Myung-soo
  as Jae-hoon
 Kim Do-joon
 Kim Mo-bum
 Kim Dae-han

Special appearances 
 Lee Byung-joon

Production 
 Jung Da-bin was first offered the female lead role, but declined due to her schedule.
 First script reading took place January 13, 2017 at KBS Annex Broadcasting Station in Yeouido, Seoul, South Korea.
 Filming began on January 18, 2017, and ended on March 30.
 Filming mostly take place in Yeoju, including filming at Yeogang High School.

Original soundtrack

Part 1

Part 2

Part 3

Part 4

Part 5

Part 6

Ratings 
 In the table below, the blue numbers represent the lowest ratings and the red numbers represent the highest ratings.

International broadcast 
 According to KBS World, "Andante" has been contracted to all countries in Asia, excluding China, and Europe. The countries will be able to watch the series at the same time as its broadcast. 
 24/09/2017 - Malaysia (Every Sunday - 6.30 p.m.). - Thailand (Every Weekends - 9.45 a.m.).
 Andante will air in Japan on KNTV starting from March 10, 2019.

References

External links 
  
 
 
 

Korean Broadcasting System television dramas
2017 South Korean television series debuts
2018 South Korean television series endings
Korean-language television shows
Television series produced in Seoul
South Korean teen dramas
South Korean pre-produced television series
Television series about teenagers